Nathan Rodes (born 11 December 1997) is a Belgian footballer who plays for Dender.

References 

1997 births
People from Nivelles
Footballers from Walloon Brabant
Living people
Belgian footballers
Association football midfielders
K.V. Woluwe-Zaventem players
R. Charleroi S.C. players
Union Titus Pétange players
RFC Liège players
F.C.V. Dender E.H. players
Luxembourg National Division players
Challenger Pro League players
Belgian National Division 1 players
Belgian expatriate footballers
Expatriate footballers in Luxembourg
Belgian expatriate sportspeople in Luxembourg